Dudin  ( ['dudʲin], with its female form Dudina) is a Russian surname derived from the Russian word дудка for "fife", "pipe" that is also present in the Russian diaspora.
Notable people with the name Dudin/Dudina include:
Aleksei Dudin (born 1977), former Russian footballer
Ann Dudin Brown (1822–1917), English philanthropist
Mariia Dudina (born 1998), Russian handballer 
Nedal Dudin (1974-2023),
Consultant TRACE Consulting Ltd
Marwan Dudin (1936–2016), Jordanian government minister
Mikhail Dudin (1916–1993), Russian poet
Nikolai Dudin (born 1973), Soviet-Russian serial killer
Samuil Dudin (1863–1929), Russian ethnographer, photographer, artist and explorer
Valery Dudin (born 1963), Soviet-Russian luger
Yelena Dudina, Soviet-Russian canoer

References

Russian-language surnames
Arabic-language surnames